Tally Monastyryov (7 November 1939 – 31 January 2011) was a Soviet alpine skier. He competed in three events at the 1964 Winter Olympics.

References

External links
 

1939 births
2011 deaths
Soviet male alpine skiers
Olympic alpine skiers of the Soviet Union
Alpine skiers at the 1964 Winter Olympics
Skiers from Moscow